The New Zealand national cricket team toured Pakistan in October to November 1955 and played a three-match Test series against the Pakistan national cricket team. It was the first Test series between the two teams. Pakistan won the Test series 2–0. New Zealand were captained by Harry Cave and Pakistan by Abdul Hafeez Kardar.

After the Test series, the team went on to India, where they played a five-Test series.

New Zealand team
 Harry Cave (captain)
 John Reid (vice-captain)
 Jack Alabaster
 John Guy
 Noel Harford
 Zin Harris
 Johnny Hayes 
 Graham Leggat
 Tony MacGibbon
 Noel McGregor
 Trevor McMahon
 Alex Moir
 Eric Petrie
 Matt Poore
 Bert Sutcliffe

Every player played at least one Test in the series. Cave, Reid, MacGibbon, McGregor, Moir, Poore and Sutcliffe played all three Tests.

The team was managed by Henry Cooper, who was at the time headmaster of Auckland Grammar School, and had previously played three first-class matches for Auckland.

Test series summary

First Test

Second Test

Third Test

References

External links
New Zealand in India and Pakistan 1955–56 at CricketArchive
Test Cricket Tours – New Zealand to Pakistan & India 1955–56

1955 in New Zealand cricket
1955 in Pakistani cricket
1955
International cricket competitions from 1945–46 to 1960
Pakistani cricket seasons from 1947–48 to 1969–70